FC Imabari (FC今治, Efu Shī Imabari) is a Japanese football club based in Imabari, Ehime Prefecture. They currently play in the J3 League, Japan's third tier of professional football.

History
The club was founded in 1976 and were promoted to the Shikoku Football League in 2001.

From 2009 to 2011 they were owned by Ehime F.C. as their reserve team, Ehime F.C. Shimanami. After spinning off yet again, the majority of FC Imabari was bought by the former coach of Japan Takeshi Okada in 2014.

In February 2016, the club made another step forward toward the J. League as JFA recognised J. League Hundred Year Vision clubs. In November they won the Regional Promotion Series and were promoted to the Japan Football League. During their debut-season in the JFL, they opened their new stadium and got a J3 League license for the 2018 season.

In 2019, after finishing on 3rd-place in the JFL, FC Imabari were promoted to Japan's professional league system, starting on the J3 for the first time in their history.

FC Imabari acquired a J2 license in 2021, meaning that if Imabari can be promoted to the J2 once they finish the season in the promotion zone. The club will play their 4th consecutive season at the J3 League on 2023.

Stadium

Arigato Service Dream Stadium (2017–2022) 
FC Imabari played their J3 League matches on the Arigato Service Dream Stadium from 2017 to 2022. They played their final league match in there (as their home stadium) at the club's last home match of the 2022 season. Imabari played this match against Nagano Parceiro in 13 November 2022, at the 33th Matchweek, with the match ending tied by 3–3.

Imabari Satoyama Stadium (2023–) 
From 2023, Imabari decided to change its home stadium to their newly-built Imabari Satoyama Stadium. The opening ceremony was decided to be held on 29 January 2023. Satoyama Stadium was opened to the public on 29 January 2023, with a charity match contested between an XI of J-League Legends against FC Imabari U-18 and Ladies, respectively. On 5 March of the same year, FC Imabari played their first match of the season at their new stadium against Fukushima United in the J3 League, which ended in a 1–0 win for Imabari.

League and cup records 

Key

Honours
Shikoku Soccer League
Champions (5): 2011, 2012, 2013, 2015, 2016
Japanese Regional League
Champions (1): 2016

Current squad
As of 24 January 2023.

Coaching Staff
For the 2023 season.

Managerial history

Kit evolution

References

External links
 

 
Association football clubs established in 1976
Football clubs in Japan
J.League clubs
Japan Football League clubs
Sports teams in Ehime Prefecture
1976 establishments in Japan
Imabari, Ehime